Inopsis catoxantha is a moth of the family Erebidae. It was described by Felder in 1874. It is found in Mexico.

References

Lithosiina
Moths described in 1874